In mathematics, a perfect magic cube is a magic cube in which not only the columns, rows, pillars, and main space diagonals, but also the cross section diagonals sum up to the cube's magic constant.

Perfect magic cubes of order one are trivial; cubes of orders two to four can be proven not to exist, and cubes of orders five and six were first discovered by Walter Trump and Christian Boyer on November 13 and September 1, 2003, respectively. A perfect magic cube of order seven was given by A. H. Frost in 1866, and on March 11, 1875, an article was published in the Cincinnati Commercial newspaper on the discovery of a perfect magic cube of order 8 by Gustavus Frankenstein. Perfect magic cubes of orders nine and eleven have also been constructed.
The first perfect cube of order 10 was constructed in 1988 (Li Wen, China).

An alternative definition

In recent years, an alternative definition for the perfect magic cube was proposed by John R. Hendricks. By this definition, a perfect magic cube is one in which all possible lines through each cell sum to the magic constant. The name Nasik magic hypercube is another, unambiguous, name for such a cube. This definition is based on the fact that a pandiagonal magic square has traditionally been called 'perfect', because all possible lines sum correctly.

This same reasoning may be applied to hypercubes of any dimension. Simply stated; in an order m magic hypercube, if all possible lines of m cells sum to the magic constant, the hypercube is perfect. All lower dimension hypercubes contained in this hypercube will then also be perfect. This is not the case with the original definition, which does not require that the planar and diagonal squares be a pandiagonal magic cube. For example, a magic cube of order 8 has 244 correct lines by the old definition of "perfect", but 832 correct lines by this new definition.

The smallest perfect magic cube has order 8, and none can exist for double odd orders.

Gabriel Arnoux constructed an order 17 perfect magic cube in 1887. F.A.P.Barnard published order 8 and order 11 perfect cubes in 1888.

By the modern (Hendricks) definition, there are actually six classes of magic cube; simple magic cubes, pantriagonal magic cubes, diagonal magic cubes, pantriagonal diagonal magic cubes, pandiagonal magic cubes, and perfect magic cubes.

Examples
1. Order 4 cube by Thomas Krijgsman, 1982; magic constant 130.

2. Order 5 cube by Walter Trump and Christian Boyer, 2003-11-13; magic constant 315.

See also

 Magic cube classes
 Nasik magic hypercube
 John R. Hendricks

References
 
 Planck, C., The Theory of Paths Nasik, Printed for private circulation, A.J. Lawrence, Printer, Rugby,(England), 1905
 H.D, Heinz & J.R. Hendricks, Magic Square Lexicon: Illustrated, hdh, 2000, 0-9687985-0-0

External links 
 
 
 Christian Boyer: Perfect magic cubes
 MathWorld news: Perfect magic cube of order 5 discovered
  Harvey Heinz: Perfect Magic Hypercubes
 Aale de Winkel: The Magic Encyclopedia
  Impossibility Proof for doubly odd order Pandiagonal and Perfect hypercubes
 Most-perfect cube https://oeis.org/A270205

Magic squares